Wilmer Cutler Pickering Hale and Dorr LLP, also known as Hale & Dorr and WilmerHale, is an international law firm with offices in the United States, Europe and Asia. It is co-headquartered in Washington, D.C. and Boston. It was formed in 2004 through the merger of the Boston-based firm Hale and Dorr and the Washington-based, firm Wilmer Cutler & Pickering, and employs more than 1,000 attorneys worldwide.

Notable alumni include former FBI Director Robert Mueller, Special Counsel to the investigation into Russian interference in the 2016 US presidential election.

History

Hale and Dorr, 1918–2004
Hale and Dorr was founded in Boston in 1918 by Richard Hale, Dudley Huntington Dorr, Frank Grinnell, Roger Swaim and John Maguire. Reginald Heber Smith, author of the seminal work Justice and the Poor and a pioneer in the American legal aid movement, joined the firm in 1919 and served as managing partner for thirty years. Hale and Dorr gained national recognition in 1954 when partner Joseph Welch, assisted by associate James St. Clair and John Kimball, Jr., represented the U.S. Army on a pro bono basis during the historic Army-McCarthy hearings.  In 1974, James D. St. Clair represented President Richard Nixon before the Supreme Court of the United States in United States v. Nixon.  In 1988, partner Paul Brountas chaired the presidential campaign of Massachusetts Governor Michael Dukakis, and in 1990, senior partner William Weld was elected governor. The firm has had a long relationship with nearby Harvard Law School, home of the WilmerHale Legal Services Center.

In 1988, the law firm established a subsidiary as a registered investment adviser. Initially known as Haldor Investment Advisors, L.P., and then Hale Dorr Wealth Advisers. In 2008 Hale Dorr Wealth Advisors became Silver Bridge.

Wilmer, Cutler & Pickering, 1962–2004
Wilmer, Cutler & Pickering was founded in Washington in 1962 by former Cravath attorneys Lloyd Cutler and John Pickering, along with a senior lawyer, Richard H. Wilmer. Cutler, who later served as White House Counsel to Presidents Jimmy Carter and Bill Clinton, founded the Lawyers' Committee for Civil Rights Under Law in 1962 and served on its executive committee until 1987.

In the 1980s, Cutler led the founding of the Southern Africa Legal Services and Legal Education Project, to aid South African lawyers who fought to implement the rule of law during apartheid. From 1981 to 1993, partner C. Boyden Gray, a prominent member of The Federalist Society, left the firm to serve as White House Counsel to Vice President and President George H. W. Bush.  In 2003, partner Jamie Gorelick began serving as a member of the 9/11 Commission.

Combined firm, 2004–present
The two firms merged to form Wilmer Cutler Pickering Hale and Dorr in 2004, with headquarters now in both Boston and Washington.

In 2010, the law firm relocated its administrative support base to a new campus in Dayton, Ohio as it sought to streamline internal business operations across its many offices. The office houses more than 200 employees from existing WilmerHale offices and new employees from the Dayton area. Individuals in the Business Services Center include administrative support staff, bringing together services such as finance, human resources, information technology services, operations, document review and management, and practice management, which will provide improved efficiencies for administrative teams and the firm, and reduce significant operational expenses.

Reputation

According to one study examining political donations by large white shoe firms, WilmerHale was ranked as the most liberal out of the top twenty prestigious law firms in the nation.

The Washington Post ranked WilmerHale as the #1 Top Workplace in DC in 2019, and the firm has earned a Top Workplace for 8 consecutive years, and noted that the firm "has played a leading role in reimagining what 'Big Law' can be."

The American Lawyer named WilmerHale Law Firm of the Year in 2021 and noted that for 17 years, the law firm has earned a spot on its A-List, which takes into consideration not just revenues, but pro bono work, diversity, and attorney satisfaction.

The firm is also well known for its litigation and trial expertise. In The American Lawyer's biennial Litigation Department of the Year contest honoring law firms considered the “absolute best in the industry when it comes to litigation prowess”, they highlighted that the firm has a strong reputation in the most important practice areas such as public policy and legislative affairs, regulation, antitrust, intellectual property and international trade and that WilmerHale is home to some of the most well-known appellate and Supreme Court litigators in the country.

Clients

A Civil Action
In the late 1980s, Hale and Dorr partner Jerome Facher represented Beatrice Foods in a suit by eight families from Woburn, Massachusetts who claimed that Beatrice, along with W.R. Grace, had polluted the town's water supply, resulting in an elevated number of leukemia cases and immune-system disorders. The case was memorialized in the book A Civil Action, by Jonathan Harr, and in a movie of the same name starring Robert Duvall as Facher and John Travolta as plaintiffs' lawyer Jan Schlichtmann. Upon further discovery, the EPA took the case on and W.R. Grace was successfully indicted for making false statements. Both W. R. Grace and Beatrice Foods paid a total $64.9M to clean up the contaminated sites in Woburn.

Enron and WorldCom reports
In the wake of news articles raising concerns about transactions between Enron and its CFO, Andy Fastow, lawyers from Wilmer, Cutler & Pickering represented a special investigative committee of Enron's board of directors in an internal investigation into those transactions. The resulting report, known as the "Powers Report," laid out the facts that have been the predicate for much of the public discussion of Enron since that time.

Similarly, after WorldCom's announcement that it would have to restate financial statements, the firm represented a special investigative committee of WorldCom's board of directors in performing an internal investigation into the accounting irregularities. The investigation resulted in a widely covered written report that detailed a variety of accounting issues as well as the role of management and the board of directors.

Apple Inc. v. Samsung Electronics Co. Ltd. et al
WilmerHale counseled Apple Inc. in its hotly contested smartphone patent dispute with Samsung Electronics Co. The two parties reached a settlement in 2018 after a seven-year-long battle that began when Apple accused Samsung of infringing numerous design and utility patents related to the iPhone.

PerkinElmer’s Acquisition of BioLegend
In 2021, WilmerHale represented PerkinElmer in its acquisition of life sciences company BioLegend for $5.25 billion, the largest acquisition to date for PerkinElmer. President and CEO of PerkinElmer Prahlad Singh said the deal will "push science and discovery forward."

Other notable and controversial clients

In 1986, Wilmer, Cutler & Pickering represented corporate raider Ivan Boesky in high-profile Department of Justice and SEC proceedings, as well as multiple class actions based on his participation in insider trading violations.

Wilmer, Cutler & Pickering represented Swiss banks accused of profiting from the Holocaust in their settlement negotiations with plaintiffs. The firm also represented Siemens AG, Krupp AG, and other German companies accused of exploiting forced laborers during the Nazi era.

Since 2005, WilmerHale has represented Senator William Frist in regard to an SEC insider trading investigation.

WilmerHale was hired to represent PepsiCo in the SEC investigation related to the departure of PepsiCo general counsel Maura Smith. In the course of this representation, a WilmerHale attorney inadvertently e-mailed a confidential legal memorandum to a Wall Street Journal reporter as part of an internal communication to other attorneys working on the matter, which made several details of the investigation public.

In early December 2022 Caroline Ellison, former CEO of Alameda Research, hired Stephanie Avakian  as her lead attorney.

Pro bono
Both Hale and Dorr and Wilmer, Cutler & Pickering have a long history of involvement in pro bono work. WilmerHale has ranked at or near the top of The American Lawyer pro bono ranking since the merger. In recent years, the firm has been involved in several high-profile cases.

WilmerHale lawyers dedicated pro bono hours to addressing issues of systemic racial injustice following the murder of George Floyd in 2020. This work included advocating to ensure that the state of Michigan prioritized Covid vaccinations for prisoners. 

Attorneys at the firm also challenged the legality of Georgia’s voting maps, claiming that the revised maps diluted Black voting strength.

Guantanamo controversy

A team of WilmerHale attorneys represents the "Algerian Six", a group of men who fell under suspicion of planning to attack the US embassy in Bosnia and who are now held in the Guantanamo Bay detainment camp.

In 2006, attorney Melissa Hoffer, then part of the team with WilmerHale, delivered a speech in Caen, France, critical of U.S. detainee policy. Other WilmerHale lawyers participating in the case include Stephen Oleskey and Rob Kirsch.

In January 2007, Cully Stimson, deputy assistant secretary of defense for detainee affairs, criticized WilmerHale and other major law firms for representing "the very terrorists who hit their bottom line back in 2001," and questioned whether such work was really being done pro bono or might actually receive funding from shadowy sources. In a Wall Street Journal editorial criticizing Stimson, Harvard Law School professor (and former United States Solicitor General under President Reagan) Charles Fried wrote:

In December 2007, Seth Waxman made the oral argument to the Supreme Court in Boumediene v. Bush which upheld habeas corpus rights for detainees at Guantanamo Bay.

See also
List of largest United States-based law firms by profits per partner

References

External links
Wilmer Hale
Wilmer Hale History
"Long, Long Law Firm Names Grow Short and Snappy", from The Boston Globe
"WilmerHale: A Merger's Tale", from Massachusetts Lawyers Weekly

 
Intellectual property law firms
Biopharmaceutical law firms
Law firms established in 2004
Law firms based in Washington, D.C.
Law firms based in Boston
2004 establishments in the United States